Charalambos Theopemptou (born 26 November 1955) is a Greek Cypriot politician. He is a member of the House of Representatives and is leader of the Movement of Ecologists – Citizens' Cooperation.

References 
1955 births
Living people
Leaders of political parties in Cyprus
Members of the House of Representatives (Cyprus)

Alumni of City, University of London

See also 

 List of members of the House of Representatives (Cyprus), 2016–2021